Selenium compounds commonly exist in the oxidation states −2, +2, +4, and +6.

Chalcogen compounds

Selenium forms two oxides: selenium dioxide (SeO2) and selenium trioxide (SeO3). Selenium dioxide is formed by the reaction of elemental selenium with oxygen:
Se8 + 8 O2 -> 8 SeO2
It is a polymeric solid that forms monomeric SeO2 molecules in the gas phase. It dissolves in water to form selenous acid, H2SeO3. Selenous acid can also be made directly by oxidizing elemental selenium with nitric acid:

3 Se + 4 HNO3 + H2O -> 3 H2SeO3 + 4 NO
Unlike sulfur, which forms a stable trioxide, selenium trioxide is thermodynamically unstable and decomposes to the dioxide above 185 °C:

2 SeO3 -> 2 SeO2 + O2 (ΔH = −54 kJ/mol)
Selenium trioxide is produced in the laboratory by the reaction of anhydrous potassium selenate (K2SeO4) and sulfur trioxide (SO3).

Salts of selenous acid are called selenites. These include silver selenite (Ag2SeO3) and sodium selenite (Na2SeO3).

Hydrogen sulfide reacts with aqueous selenous acid to produce selenium disulfide:
H2SeO3 + 2 H2S -> SeS2 + 3 H2O

Selenium disulfide consists of 8-membered rings. It has an approximate composition of SeS2, with individual rings varying in composition, such as Se4S4 and Se2S6. Selenium disulfide has been used in shampoo as an antidandruff agent, an inhibitor in polymer chemistry, a glass dye, and a reducing agent in fireworks.

Selenium trioxide may be synthesized by dehydrating selenic acid, H2SeO4, which is itself produced by the oxidation of selenium dioxide with hydrogen peroxide:
SeO2 + H2O2 -> H2SeO4

Hot, concentrated selenic acid can react with gold to form gold(III) selenate.

Halogen compounds
Iodides of selenium are not well known. The only stable chloride is selenium monochloride (Se2Cl2), which might be better known as selenium(I) chloride; the corresponding bromide is also known. These species are structurally analogous to the corresponding disulfur dichloride. Selenium dichloride is an important reagent in the preparation of selenium compounds (e.g. the preparation of Se7). It is prepared by treating selenium with sulfuryl chloride (SO2Cl2). Selenium reacts with fluorine to form selenium hexafluoride:
Se8 + 24 F2 -> 8 SeF6

In comparison with its sulfur counterpart (sulfur hexafluoride), selenium hexafluoride (SeF6) is more reactive and is a toxic pulmonary irritant.
Some of the selenium oxyhalides, such as selenium oxyfluoride (SeOF2) and selenium oxychloride (SeOCl2) have been used as specialty solvents.

Selenides
Analogous to the behavior of other chalcogens, selenium forms hydrogen selenide, H2Se. It is a strongly odiferous, toxic, and colorless gas. It is more acidic than H2S. In solution it ionizes to HSe−. The selenide dianion Se2− forms a variety of compounds, including the minerals from which selenium is obtained commercially. Illustrative selenides include mercury selenide (HgSe), lead selenide (PbSe), zinc selenide (ZnSe), and copper indium gallium diselenide (Cu(Ga,In)Se2). These materials are semiconductors. With highly electropositive metals, such as aluminium, these selenides are prone to hydrolysis:
Al2Se3 + 3 H2O -> Al2O3 + 3 H2Se
Alkali metal selenides react with selenium to form polyselenides, which exist as chains.

Other compounds
Tetraselenium tetranitride, Se4N4, is an explosive orange compound analogous to tetrasulfur tetranitride (S4N4).

Selenium reacts with cyanides to yield selenocyanates:
8 KCN + Se8 -> 8 KSeCN

Organoselenium compounds

Selenium, especially in the II oxidation state, forms stable bonds to carbon, which are structurally analogous to the corresponding organosulfur compounds. Especially common are selenides (R2Se, analogues of thioethers), diselenides (R2Se2, analogues of disulfides), and selenols (RSeH, analogues of thiols). Representatives of selenides, diselenides, and selenols include respectively selenomethionine, diphenyldiselenide, and benzeneselenol. The sulfoxide in sulfur chemistry is represented in selenium chemistry by the selenoxides (formula RSe(O)R), which are intermediates in organic synthesis, as illustrated by the selenoxide elimination reaction. Consistent with trends indicated by the double bond rule, selenoketones, R(C=Se)R, and selenaldehydes, R(C=Se)H, are rarely observed.

See also
 Arsenic compounds
 Bromine compounds

References

Selenium
Selenium compounds
Chemical compounds by element